Murat Tosun (born 10 August 1951) is a Turkish alpine skier. He competed in two events at the 1976 Winter Olympics.

References

1951 births
Living people
Turkish male alpine skiers
Olympic alpine skiers of Turkey
Alpine skiers at the 1976 Winter Olympics
Place of birth missing (living people)
20th-century Turkish people